The Scoop is a 1934 British crime film directed by Maclean Rogers and starring Anne Grey, Tom Helmore and Wally Patch. A reporter kills another man in self-defence.

Cast
 Anne Grey ...  Mrs. Banyon
 Tom Helmore ...  Scoop Moreton
 Peggy Blythe ...  Marion Melville
 Wally Patch ...  Harry Humphries
 Arthur Hambling ...  Inspector Stephenson
 Reginald Bach ...  Daniels
 Roland Culver ...  Barney Somers
 Cameron Carr ...  Douglas Banyon
 Marjorie Shotter ...  Reporter
 Moore Marriott ...  Jim Stewart

References

External links

1934 films
1934 crime films
Films directed by Maclean Rogers
Films about journalists
British black-and-white films
British and Dominions Studios films
Films shot at Imperial Studios, Elstree
British crime films
1930s British films